Gary Martin may refer to:

 Gary Martin (actor) (born 1958), English voice actor and actor
 Gary Martin (Zimbabwean cricketer) (born 1966), former Zimbabwean ODI cricket bowler
 Gary Martin (English cricketer) (born 1968), former English cricketer
 Gary Martin (ethnobotanist) (born 1958), American anthropologist and ethnobotanist
 Gary Martin (footballer) (born 1990), English association footballer
 Gary Martin (programmer)
 Gary Martin (reporter)
 Gary E. Martin (born 1940), American chemist
 Gary Montez Martin, perpetrator of the Aurora, Illinois shooting

See also